Alawi, also transliterated as Alevi, Alevi, Alavi, Alawid, or Alawite, is  an adjective denoting "of or related to Ali", the Prophet Muhammad's cousin. As a proper noun it is used by individuals, dynasties, places, and religious sects and organizations who identify as being either descendants or followers of Ali. It may refer to:

Places
 Alawi (sheikhdom), a historic principality in Yemen
 Alawite State, a French mandate territory in the coastal area of present-day Syria
 Alavi, Iran (disambiguation), places in Iran

Groups

Dynasties
 'Alawi dynasty, the current royal family of Morocco since the 17th century
 Alawiyya dynasty, the former royal family of Egypt and Sudan
 Alavids, the Zaydi Alid dynasty of Tabaristan in northern Iran during the 9th and 10th centuries
 Ba 'Alawi sada, a family and social group in Yemen and descendants of Imam Ahmad al-Muhajir through Alawi bin Ubaydillah

Religion
 Alawites, a Shia minority sect in Syria, also known as Nusayris
 Aleviler in Turkey
 Alevis, a Shia minority sect in Turkey
 Bektashiyyah, a related school or sect in Turkey and the Balkans
 Kızılbaşlar, a sub-sect of the Alevis
 Alavi Bohra, an Tayyibi-Isma'ili Shia minority sect in India and Pakistan
 Ba 'Alawiyya, a Sunni Sufi order in Yemen, also known as Tariqa Alawiyya

Other uses
 Alawi (name), a surname and given name
 Alavi (surname), a surname
 Hawaiʻi creeper, also known as ʻalawī

See also
 Alvi (disambiguation)